Hugo Falcandus was a historian who chronicled the reign of William I of Sicily and the minority of his son William II in a highly critical work entitled The History of the Tyrants of Sicily (or Liber de Regno Sicilie). The Latin of the work is polished. There is some doubt as to whether "Hugo Falcandus" is a real name or a pseudonym. Evelyn Jamison argued that he was Eugenius, amiratus from 1190. The Frenchman Hugues Foucaud (Hugo Fulcaudus), abbot of Saint-Denis, has been proposed as an author. His name, Falcandus, is apparently a cacography for Falcaudus, Latin for "Foucaud", a French surname.

The History covers the period from the death of Roger II in 1154 to the majority of William II, in 1169. Hugo concentrates on the internal politics of the Palermitan Norman court. Intrigues and scandals are never ignored. He has a low opinion of most of his contemporaries and ascribes villainous intent to next to all actions. Nevertheless, his detailed account is so far above other narratives of like time and place that he cannot on grounds of bias be overlooked. According to Lord Norwich, he "has been compared to Tacitus and Thucydides."

The first English translation, by G. A. Loud and T. Wiedemann, was published in 1998.

References

Sources

 Alio, Jacqueline. Margaret, Queen of Sicily. Trinacria: New York, 2017.
 Norwich, John Julius. The Kingdom in the Sun 1130-1194. Longman: London, 1970.
 History of the Tyrants of Sicily at The Latin Library
 G. B.: La 'Historia' o 'Liber de Regno Sicilie' e la Epistola ad Petrum Panormitane Ecclesie Thesaurarium di Ugo Falcando, bearb. v. , Siragusa, Roma 1897

French chroniclers
12th-century French historians
12th century in the Kingdom of Sicily
Year of birth unknown
Place of birth unknown
Year of death unknown
Place of death unknown
French male writers
12th-century Latin writers